Asian U23 bests in the sport of athletics are the all-time best marks set in competition by aged 22 or younger throughout the entire calendar year of the performance and competing for a member nation of the Asian Athletics Association (AAA). Technically, in all under-23 age divisions, the age is calculated "on December 31 of the year of competition" to avoid age group switching during a competitive season. AAA does not maintain an official list for such performances. All bests shown on this list are tracked by statisticians not officially sanctioned by the governing body.

Outdoor

Men

Women

Indoor

Men

Women

References

Asian
Under-23